Srikumar Mukherjee is a politician and a former minister in the Left front government from 1996 to 2011. He is a member of the Communist Party of India (CPI) and represented Itahar Constituency, Uttar Dinajpur, West Bengal for three terms. He has a Doctorate in Mathematics from IIT Kharagpur. Mukherjee was Minister of State for Civil Defense, Govt. of West Bengal.

References

Year of birth missing (living people)
Living people
Communist Party of India politicians from West Bengal
West Bengal MLAs 1996–2001
West Bengal MLAs 2001–2006
West Bengal MLAs 2006–2011